Aleksandr Li (born 17 January 1974) is a Kazakhstani archer. He competed in the men's individual and team events at the 2000 Summer Olympics.

References

External links
 
 
 

1974 births
Living people
Kazakhstani male archers
Olympic archers of Kazakhstan
Archers at the 2000 Summer Olympics
Place of birth missing (living people)
Asian Games medalists in archery
Archers at the 2002 Asian Games
Asian Games bronze medalists for Kazakhstan
Medalists at the 2002 Asian Games
20th-century Kazakhstani people
21st-century Kazakhstani people